Laura Dupuy Lasserre (born 18 September 1967) is a Uruguayan diplomat, and beginning in 2009, was the Permanent Representative of Uruguay to the United Nations Office at Geneva with the rank of Ambassador. She was elected President of the United Nations Human Rights Council in 2011.

Life
Lasserre was born in Montevideo in 1967. She graduated in 1990 in International Relations at the University of the Oriental Republic of Uruguay.

She was elected President of the United Nations Human Rights Council for the term 2011–2012.

Dupuy served as Director of Human Rights and Humanitarian Law at the Ministry of Foreign Affairs of Uruguay, as Director for the Americas, responsible for bilateral relations with the 34 countries in the region, and as President-Rapporteur of the Social Forum 2010 on Climate Change and Human Rights.

References

1967 births
Living people
People from Montevideo
Permanent Representatives of Uruguay to the United Nations
University of the Republic (Uruguay) alumni
Uruguayan women diplomats
Women ambassadors
Ambassadors of Uruguay to the Netherlands